The 36th Annual Imagen Awards, presented by the Imagen Foundation to honor Latino talent and contributions within television and film, were held on October 10, 2021 with the winners announced via a virtual ceremony on PBSSoCal.org and KECT.org.

Winners and nominees
The nominations were announced on August 2, 2021 by Helen Hernandez, the President of The Imagen Foundation.

Winners in each category are listed first, in boldface.

Film

Television

Additional Nominations

References

External links
Official website

2021 film awards
2021 television awards